Polites rhesus, the Rhesus skipper or plains gray skipper, is a butterfly in the family Hesperiidae. It is found in North America from Texas to North Dakota, as far north, but infrequently, as Saskatchewan and Alberta.

The wingspan is 25–30 mm.

There is one generation in May and June. Its habitats include short-grass and mixed grass prairie.

The larvae feed on grasses, including blue grama (Bouteloua gracilis). Adults feed on nectar from flowers including Drummond's milkvetch (Astragalus drummondii).

References

External links
Rhesus Skipper, Butterflies and Moths of North America

Butterflies of North America
Polites (butterfly)
Butterflies described in 1876
Taxa named by William Henry Edwards